The following is a list of Major League Baseball players, retired or active as of the 2010 season.

Ma

References

External links
Last Names starting with M – Baseball-Reference.com

 Ma